
Year 565 (DLXV) was a common year starting on Thursday (link will display the full calendar) of the Julian calendar. The denomination 565 for this year has been used since the early medieval period, when the Anno Domini calendar era became the prevalent method in Europe for naming years.

Events 
 By place 
 Byzantine Empire 
 November 15 – Justin II succeeds his uncle Justinian I as emperor of the Byzantine Empire. He begins his reign by refusing subsidies to the Avars, who conduct several large-scale raids through the Balkan Peninsula.
 Justin II recalls his cousin Justin (pretender to the throne) to Constantinople; after accusations against him, he is placed under house arrest.
 Justin II sends his son-in-law Baduarius (magister militum) with a Byzantine army, to support the Gepids in their war against the Lombards.Jarnut 1995, p. 22.
 The Madaba Map is made in the Byzantine church of Saint George. The floor mosaic contains the depiction of the Holy Land (approximate date).

 Britain 
 Columba, Irish missionary, spots the Loch Ness Monster on the River Ness present day Scotland and saves the life of a Pict (approximate date).

 Europe 
 Summer – A war erupts between Alboin, the king of the Lombards, and King Cunimund, the leader of the Gepids. (approximate date).

 Asia 
 Gao Wei succeeds his father Wu Cheng Di as ruler of the Chinese Northern Qi Dynasty. Wu Cheng Di becomes a regent and Grand Emperor.
 The Uyghurs are defeated by the Göktürks, who expand their territory in Central Asia (approximate date).

 Central America 
 February 6 – K'an Joy Chitam I, ruler of the Mayan city-state of Palenque, in what is now the state of Chiapas in southern Mexico, dies after a reign of exactly 36 years.
 May 2 – Ahkal Moʼ Nahb II becomes the new ruler of Palenque and reigns until his death in 570.

 By topic 
 Arts and sciences 
 Agathias begins to write a history, beginning where Procopius finished his work.

 Religion 
 January 22 – Patriarch Eutychius of Constantinople is deposed as Ecumenical Patriarch of Constantinople by Justinian I after he refuses the Byzantine Emperor's order to adopt the tenets of the Aphthartodocetae, a sect of Monophysites. From April 12 he is replaced by John Scholasticus.
 Columba begins preaching in the Orkney Islands (approximate date).

Births 
 Chen Yueyi, empress of Northern Zhou (approximate date)
 Cuthwine, prince of Wessex (approximate date)
 Gundoald, Bavarian nobleman (approximate date)
 Marutha of Tikrit, Persian theologian (d. 649)
 Mirin, Irish monk and missionary (approximate date)
 Sisebut, king of the Visigoths (approximate date)
 Witteric, king of the Visigoths (approximate date)
 Yuan Leshang, empress of Northern Zhou

Deaths 
 November 14 – Justinian I, emperor of the Byzantine Empire
 Audoin, king of the Lombards (approximate date)
 Belisarius, Byzantine general ("Last of the Romans")
 Diarmait mac Cerbaill, High King (approximate date)
 Dorotheus of Gaza, monk and abbot (approximate date)
 Procopius, Byzantine historian (approximate date)
 Samson of Dol, bishop and saint (approximate date)

Establishments 
 Saint Catherine's Monastery in Mount Sinai, Saint Catherine, South Sinai Governorate, Egypt by Justinian I, which contains the oldest active library, being Ebla tablets (c. 2500–2250 BC) in the city of Ebla, Syria, discovered by Italian archaeologist Paolo Matthiae and his team in 1974–75, the first, if not the oldest, inactive library.

References